The Lee G. Simmons Conservation Park and Wildlife Safari is a 440 acre drive-through park located near the town of Ashland, Nebraska, United States. The Park includes scenic prairies and wetlands that feature dozens of native North American animals including bison, elk, cranes and new Wolf Canyon overlook along with tram rides and a visitor center. The park is affiliated with Henry Doorly Zoo, and is located 22 miles west at Nebraska's I-80 exit 426.

References

External links 

Zoos in Nebraska
Organizations based in Omaha, Nebraska
Parks in Omaha, Nebraska
1998 establishments in Nebraska
Tourist attractions in Omaha, Nebraska
Aviaries in the United States